Arthur Frederick Bolton (21 November 1912 – 2001) was an English professional footballer who played as a forward for Sunderland.

References

1912 births
2001 deaths
Sportspeople from Hexham
Footballers from Northumberland
English footballers
Association football forwards
Ashington A.F.C. players
Sunderland A.F.C. players
English Football League players